Catharina Bernadetta Jacoba ("Tineke") Lagerberg (born 30 January 1941) is a retired Dutch swimmer who won the bronze medal in the 400 m freestyle at the 1960 Summer Olympics in a time of 4:56.9. She was also part of the Dutch team that broke the 4×100 m medley Olympic record in the preliminaries; however, they finished fourth in the final. Lagerberg broke the world record in the women's 200 m butterfly on 13 September 1958 in Naarden, Netherlands. She was also part of the Dutch relay team that set a new world record in the 4×100 m medley in the same year.

References

1941 births
Living people
Dutch female freestyle swimmers
Dutch female butterfly swimmers
World record setters in swimming
European Aquatics Championships medalists in swimming
Medalists at the 1960 Summer Olympics
Olympic bronze medalists for the Netherlands
Olympic bronze medalists in swimming
Olympic swimmers of the Netherlands
Swimmers at the 1960 Summer Olympics
People from Bussum
Sportspeople from North Holland
20th-century Dutch women